Roy RIke Field, usually referred to simply as Roy Rike, is the soccer field of the Jay Martin Soccer Complex at Ohio Wesleyan University in Delaware, Ohio, where the Battling Bishops' soccer teams play.  The field—named after the Roy Rike, Class of 1942. It is also the home of the Columbus Lady Shooting Stars soccer team.

Roy Rike Field is located just west of the residential side of Ohio Wesleyan University. Roy Rike hosted the NCAA Division III men's soccer championship in 1990 and 1998 and the NCAA Division III women's soccer championship in 2001.

The seating capacity of Roy Rike Field is about 600.

External links
 Roy Rike Field

Ohio Wesleyan University buildings
Sports venues in Ohio
Soccer venues in Ohio
College soccer venues in the United States